Roderick John Long Jr. (born January 27, 1950) is an American football coach and former player. He is currently the defensive coordinator at Syracuse. Prior to being hired by Syracuse, Long was the defensive coordinator at  New Mexico. He played professionally with BC Lions of the Canadian Football League (CFL) and the Detroit Wheels of World Football League (WFL).

Playing career
Long was the starting quarterback for the New Mexico Lobos football team from 1969 to 1971, recording consecutive winning seasons and earning player-of-the-year honors in the Western Athletic Conference (WAC) in 1971.  His professional career began with the BC Lions of the Canadian Football League (CFL) in 1972, with which he played 68 games in total. In 1974, he departed to the Detroit Wheels of the World Football League (WFL). That year, he intercepted three passes for 38 return yards, and returned 20 punts for 217 yards and 14 kickoffs for 402 yards. He returned to the Lions for three years and had one of his best years in 1975, when he intercepted a team high eight passes for 88 yards. A Western All-Star in 1977, Long also led the team in punt returns in his last three years, and is still the fourth leading all-time returner, with 1946 yards on 192 punt returns, with one touchdown.

Coaching career
Long returned to New Mexico as the head football coach on December 20, 1997. His overall won-loss record was 65–69 in 11 seasons. His 65 wins are the most of any head coach in program history.  Long surpassed Roy W. Johnson's mark of 41 wins during the 2005 season.

Long led the Lobos to three straight bowl games from 2003 to 2005, a first in program history.  The Lobos were bowl-eligible for seven straight seasons, from 2001 to 2007, another program record. This streak continued into the 2007 season as the Lobos accepted a bid to the New Mexico Bowl, where Long garnered his bowl win with a victory over the Nevada Wolf Pack.

After an 11-season career, Long resigned on November 17, 2008, two days after the Lobos' regular game season ended. Long cited that he was not the right person to lead the program to newer heights. He added that he had no plans of retirement, and that he wanted to continue to coach as a coordinator. In 2011, he was promoted to head coach at San Diego State after two seasons as their defensive coordinator.

In 2020, Long resigned from San Diego State, and Brady Hoke was named as his replacement. He left San Diego State with 81 wins, second all time in wins behind Don Coryell.  Soon after his resignation from SDSU, the University of New Mexico announced Long would be returning to the Lobos to take over as their defensive coordinator under new coach Danny Gonzales, a former player and assistant coach under Long at UNM as well as SDSU.

Personal life
Long and his wife, Debby, have two daughters, Roxanne and Hannah, who are also coaches. Roxanne is the former women's basketball program head coach at Rogers State University in Claremore, Oklahoma, and Hannah is the 
women's volleyball program head coach at Queens University of Charlotte.

Head coaching record

References

External links
 San Diego State profile

1950 births
Living people
American football quarterbacks
American players of Canadian football
Canadian football quarterbacks
BC Lions players
Detroit Wheels players
New Mexico Lobos football coaches
New Mexico Lobos football players
Oregon State Beavers football coaches
San Diego State Aztecs football coaches
TCU Horned Frogs football coaches
UCLA Bruins football coaches
Wyoming Cowboys football coaches
High school football coaches in New Mexico
Sportspeople from Provo, Utah